Lankapura Dandanatha, more commonly referred to as simply Lankapura, was a Senapati of the Sinhala Army during the reign of King Parakramabahu I. He led an expeditionary force to South India in support of the Pandyan king Parakrama Pandyan I, bringing parts of South India under their control. Lankapura succeeded in restoring the Pandyan prince to the throne, and ordered the use of Sri Lankan currency in areas under his control. Whether he died during the invasion is unclear, since Sri Lankan sources claim that Lankapura returned to Sri Lanka as a war hero, while Indian sources say that he was killed.

Name
Lankapura was the son of Lankadhinatha Kitti, a regional ruler. His real name is unclear. Dandanatha may have been his real name, and Lankapura a title. However, some sources refer to him as Dandanatha of Lankapura, indicating that Lankapura was in fact a place name, likely referring to the region of Lanka, wheres pura means place. It is also possible that Lankapura was the actual given name, and Dandanatha was a title. However, most sources, both modern and ancient, refer to him commonly as Lankapura.

Invasion
The Pandyan king Parakrama Pandya sought assistance from cousin Parakramabahu I in 1167 to face an internal strife in his country. Parakramabahu prepared an army, and appointed Senapati (General) Lankapura as its commander. However, by the time Lankapura and his army reached the port of Mahatittha (Mannar) in the north west of Sri Lanka, Parakrama Pandya had been killed by his rival Kulasekhara Pandya.

Despite this setback, Lankapura proceeded with an invasion to dethrone Kulasekhara Pandya. This was possibly launched in 1173. After sailing for a "day and night", his army landed in South India. He attacked Rameswaram and captured it after several battles. Lankapura fought with and defeated the Pandyan army in several towns and villages after this, and established a fortress at Kundukaal and named it Parakramapura after the king of Sri Lanka.

A counterattack by Kulasekhara Pandya on this fortress was repelled back, and Vira Pandya, Parakrama Pandya's son later joined up with Lankapura. The army of Lankapura continued to march forward and came to a stronghold named Semponmari. Semponmari, a great stronghold that the armies of the Chola Kingdom had failed to capture after a siege of two years, was captured by Sri Lankan forces commanded by Lankapura in around half a day . Parakramabahu sent another General named Jagath Vijaya to assist Lankapura in another battle against Kulasekhara Pandya who had returned with reinforcements, and they defeated him again. The throne was handed over to Vira Pandya. Lankapura went on to capture several more towns and villages including the city of Madura.

End of invasion
Kulasekhara Pandya subsequently obtained assistance from the Cholas and returned to fight Lankapura's army again. However, Lankapura defeated them again and burned down the Chola country for a distance of 7 leagues/38.9 kilometers. He ordered the Sri Lankan currency of Kahapana to be used in the areas under his control. Ancient Sri Lankan sources say that Lankapura returned to Sri Lanka after his victory, and was welcomed by Parakramabahu I as a great war hero and was well rewarded. The indian prisoners of war captured by Lankapura's army were sent to Sri Lanka to repair the Ruwanweli Seya and other buildings damaged by earlier Chola invasions of the country.

However, Chola inscriptions (such as the Arapakkam inscription) claims that he was defeated and the heads of Lankapura and Jagath Vijaya were nailed to the gates of Madura. After Lankapura's death or return to Sri Lanka, the forces of the Sri Lankan king were said to be defeated by Kulasekhara Pandya who ultimately regains the throne.

References

People of the Kingdom of Polonnaruwa
Pandyan Civil War (1169–1177)
Sinhalese people
Military history of Sri Lanka